Justicia aurea, the Brazilian plume or yellow jacobinia,  is an ornamental  shrub native to the Cerrado vegetation of Brazil. This plant may be propagated by herbaceous stem cutting, and it can usually get to 1,50 - 2,50 m tall.  They flourish in the shade, and will not do well if overwatered.

External links
Justicia aurea
 Justicia aurea

aurea
Flora of Brazil